Super Friends: The Legendary Super Powers Show is an American animated television series about a team of superheroes which ran from 1984 to 1985 on ABC. It was produced by Hanna-Barbera Productions and is based on the Justice League and associated comic book characters published by DC Comics.

Format
Super Friends: The Legendary Super Powers Show was the first Super Friends series in a new format since 1979's The World's Greatest Super Friends. Continuing the previous three years' policy of producing short stories, this series' format was two stories per half-hour, so all the separate stories were ten minutes long each. Furthermore, the Wonder Twins were largely supplanted as audience identification figures by Firestorm, a well-established teenage superhero in the DC Comics Universe.  However, continuing the trend from the "lost season" episodes, the Wonder Twins were paired with other Justice League members, as opposed to always teaming up with Wonder Woman or Batman and Robin.  In "Case of The Shrinking Super Friends" they are teamed with Firestorm and Robin.  In "Uncle Mxyzptlk" they work with Firestorm and Samurai.  In "Village of The Lost Souls" they work with Wonder Woman and Apache Chief.

For the next season, the show was retitled The Super Powers Team: Galactic Guardians.

Toyline tie-in
Unlike the previous series, Super Friends: The Legendary Super Powers Show was produced to tie in with the Super Powers Collection toyline produced by Kenner, hence the name change. The general story, as detailed in the mini-comics that accompanied the figures, was that the major heroes of Earth had teamed up to fight Darkseid and his villains.

Characters

Super Friends/Justice League of America
Thirteen heroes made up the Super Friends. They were:

 Superman
 Batman
 Robin
 Wonder Woman
 Green Lantern
 Firestorm
 Black Vulcan
 Gleek
 Apache Chief
 Samurai
 El Dorado
 Wonder Twins (Zan and Jayna)

According to DC writer/historian Mark Waid, Aquaman's sole appearance in The Legendary Super Powers Show comes via his appearance within the opening credits. The same is true for The Flash. This was the first time Wonder Woman was animated with the W symbol on her costume instead of the eagle design; this carried over into the final series, Galactic Guardians. Shannon Farnon was unable to reprise her voice work for Wonder Woman because the new voice director cast his girlfriend Connie Cawfield in her place. The series was also noteworthy for using Adam West as the voice of Batman, two decades after the end of his live-action television series of Batman. West replaced Olan Soule and would continue through the subsequent Galactic Guardians series.

Villains
 Darkseid – Outside of the comic books for the first time, Darkseid was still attempting to conquer Earth (often with help from other villains), but also had a secondary goal, of making Wonder Woman his bride. Darkseid brought a degree of seriousness to a show that had largely lacked it.
 Kalibak – His appearance was not as brutish as in later TV incarnations, more like the original Jack Kirby design for the character. He was almost always depicted as boastful, dull-witted, and ineffectual against the heroes.
 Desaad
 Brainiac – The mechanical version of Brainiac appeared in the episodes "The Wrath of Brainiac" and "The Village of Lost Souls". In "The Wrath of Brainiac," Brainiac reveals that he shed his earlier appearance when he worked alongside Darkseid.
 Mirror Master – Mirror Master appeared in an episode entitled "Reflections in Crime". Despite Mirror Master being a Flash villain, The Flash does not appear in this episode. In the episode, Mirror Master sets about trapping the Super Friends in this particular episode inside mirrors called the sixth dimension. The Super Friends managed to escape and trap Mirror Master in a House of Mirrors.
 Lex Luthor – He appeared in the opening and the episodes "No Honor Among Super Thieves" (in which acquires his power suit from the comics of then), "Case of the Shrinking Super Friends" and "The Mask of Mystery".
 Mister Mxyzptlk – In this series, Mxyzptlk's name is pronounced as Miks-ill-plik (backwards, Kilp-ill-skim) and he takes to tormenting all the members of the team, even when Superman is absent.
 The Robber Baron and Sleeves
 Dollmaker

For this series, Lex Luthor and Brainiac were completely revamped to resemble their comic book counterparts.

List of episodes

Cast
 Jack Angel – Samurai
 René Auberjonois – DeSaad
 James Avery – Alien Auctioneer (in "Darkseid's Golden Trap"), Cromar (in "Darkseid's Golden Trap")
 Michael Bell – Zan, Gleek 
 Gregg Berger – Benny the Bungler (in "Mr. Mxyzptlk and the Magic Lamp"), Ernie (in "Mr. Mxyzpltlk and the Magic Lamp)
 Arthur Burghardt – General Plankton (in "Mr. Mxyzptlk and the Magic Lamp")
 Howard Caine – Dr. Dan Corwin (in "Island of the Dinosoids"), King Timon (in "The Royal Ruse")
 Connie Cawlfield – Diana Prince / Wonder Woman
 Danny Dark – Kal-El/Clark Kent/Superman
 Fernando Escandon – El Dorado
 Patrick Fraley – Captain Mystery/Sidney Wanamaker (in "Mask of Mystery"), Bank Guard (in "Mask of Mystery"), Remlar (in "The Curator")
 Liz Georges – Little Superman (in "Uncle Mxyzptlk")
 Buster Jones – Black Vulcan
 Stan Jones – Lex Luthor, Robber Baron (in "Mask of Mystery"), Sleeves (in "Mask of Mystery")
 Casey Kasem – Dick Grayson / Robin , Mirror Master (in "Reflections in Crime")
 Mary McDonald-Lewis – Lois Lane
 Mickey McGowan – Princess Tara (in "The Royal Ruse")
 Stanley Ralph Ross – Brainiac
 Michael Rye – Apache Chief, Hal Jordan/Green Lantern, Dr. Dan Corwin's Assistant (in "Island of the Dinosoids")
 Olan Soule – Professor Martin Stein
 Mark Taylor – Ronald Raymond/Firestorm
 Dick Tufeld - Announcer 
 B.J. Ward - Jayna
 Frank Welker – Uxas/Darkseid, Kalibak, Mister Mxyzptlk, Trucker (in "The Wrath of Brainiac"), Inspector Throckmorton (in "Mr. Mxyzptlk and the Magic Lamp"), Dollmaker (in "The Case of the Dreadful Dolls")
 Adam West – Bruce Wayne/Batman
 Bill Woodson - Narrator

Note: Beginning with this version, Adam West replaced Olan Soule as the voice of Batman.

Crew
 Gordon Hunt - Recording Director
 Mitch Schauer - Title Design, Story Director

Production credits
 Producer: Kay Wright
 Story Editors: Alan Burnett, Jeff Segal
 Supervising Director: Ray Patterson
 Director: Oscar Dufau
 Assistant Director: Jay Sarbry
 Story Direction: Bill Barry, Michael Maliani, Lew Saw, Mitch Schauer, Kay Wright
 Recording Director: Gordon Hunt
 Animation Casting Director: Ginny McSwain
 Voices: Jack Angel, René Auberjonois, James Avery, Michael Bell, Gregg Berger, Arthur Burghardt, Howard Caine, Connie Cawlfield, Danny Dark, Fernando Escandon, Pat Fraley, Liz Georges, Buster Jones, Stanley Jones, Casey Kasem, Mary McDonald Lewis, Mickie McGowan, Howard Morris, Kathy Najimy, Stanley Ralph Ross, Michael Rye, Olan Soule, Mark Taylor, B.J. Ward, Frank Welker, Adam West, Bill Woodson
 Title Design: Mitch Schauer
 Graphics: Iraj Paran, Tom Wogatzke
 Musical Director: Hoyt Curtin
 Musical Supervisor: Paul DeKorte
 Creative Producer: Iwao Takamoto
 Design Supervisor: Bob Singer
 Character Design: Geoff Darrow, Gabriel Hoyos, Lew Ott
 Animation Supervisors: Sean Newton, Don Spencer,Roger Chiasson, Don Patterson,
 Sound Direction: Alvy Dorman, Phil Flad
 Camera: Bob Marples
 Supervising Film Editor: Larry C. Cowan
 Dubbing Supervisor: Pat Foley
 Music Editors: Cecil Broughton, Daniels McLean, Terry Moore, Joe Sandusky
 Effects Editors: Michael Bradley, David Cowan, Mary Gleason, Jon Johnson, Carol Lewis, Catherine MacKenzie, Kerry Williams, Jerry Winicki
 Show Editor: Gil Iverson
 Negative Consultant: William E. DeBoer
 Post Production Supervisor: Joed Eaton
 Production Coordinator: Peter Aries
 Production Manager: James Wang
 Executives In Charge of Production: Jayne Barbera and Jean MacCurdy
 Supervising Executive Producer: Margaret Loesch

Home media
 On August 7, 2007, Warner Home Video (via DC Entertainment, Hanna-Barbera Productions and Warner Bros. Family Entertainment) released The Complete Series of Super Friends: The Legendary Super Powers Show on DVD, featuring all 16 episodes of the eighth Hanna-Barbera-produced Super Friends series on a 2-Disc DVD boxed set, uncut and unedited, presented in its original broadcast presentation and original airdate order.

See also
 Super Powers Collection

References

External links
 Super Friends: The Legendary Super Powers Show at Big Cartoon DataBase
 

1984 American television series debuts
1985 American television series endings
1980s American animated television series
1980s American science fiction television series
Animated television shows based on DC Comics
American animated television spin-offs
American children's animated adventure television series
American children's animated science fantasy television series
American children's animated superhero television series
American Broadcasting Company original programming
Legendary Super Powers Show
Animated Batman television series
Animated Justice League television series
Animated Superman television series
Wonder Woman in other media
Television series about shapeshifting
Television series by Hanna-Barbera
Television series set in 1984
Television shows based on Hasbro toys